Kamala  'Sylvie' Chetty is a New Zealand marketing academic, and as of 2019 is a full professor at the University of Otago.

Academic career

After a 1993 PhD titled  'International trade performance of New Zealand manufacturing: An industry and enterprise-level study'  at the University of Canterbury, Chetty moved to Massey University, rising to full professor and then the University of Otago.

Selected works 
 Chetty, Sylvie, and Desiree Blankenburg Holm. "Internationalisation of small to medium-sized manufacturing firms: a network approach." International business review 9, no. 1 (2000): 77–93.
 Chetty, Sylvie. "The case study method for research in small-and medium-sized firms." International small business journal 15, no. 1 (1996): 73–85.
 Chetty, Sylvie, and Colin Campbell-Hunt. "A strategic approach to internationalization: a traditional versus a “born-global” approach." Journal of International marketing 12, no. 1 (2004): 57-81.
 Chetty, Sylvie K., and Robert T. Hamilton. "Firm-level determinants of export performance: a meta-analysis." International Marketing Review 10, no. 3 (1993).
 Chetty, Sylvie, and Colin Campbell-Hunt. "Paths to internationalisation among small-to medium-sized firms: a global versus regional approach." European journal of marketing 37, no. 5/6 (2003): 796–820.
 Chetty, Sylvie K., and Heather IM Wilson. "Collaborating with competitors to acquire resources." International Business Review 12, no. 1 (2003): 61–81.

References

External links
 

Living people
New Zealand women academics
University of Canterbury alumni
Academic staff of the University of Otago
Year of birth missing (living people)
New Zealand women writers